A supersonic wind tunnel is a wind tunnel that produces supersonic speeds (1.2<M<5)
The Mach number and flow are determined by the nozzle geometry. The Reynolds number is varied by changing the density level (pressure in the settling chamber). Therefore, a high pressure ratio is required (for a supersonic regime at M=4, this ratio is of the order of 10). Apart from that, condensation of moisture or even gas liquefaction can occur if the static temperature becomes cold enough. This means that a supersonic wind tunnel usually needs a drying or a pre-heating facility.
A supersonic wind tunnel has a large power demand, so most are designed for intermittent instead of continuous operation.

The first supersonic wind tunnel (with a cross section of 2 cm) was built in National Physical Laboratory in England, and started working in 1922.

Restrictions for supersonic tunnel operation

Minimum required pressure ratio
Optimistic estimate:
Pressure ratio  the total pressure ratio over normal shock at M in test section:

Examples:

Temperature effects: condensation
Temperature in the test section:

with  = 330 K:  = 70 K at  = 4

The velocity range is limited by reservoir temperature

Power requirements
The power required to run a supersonic wind tunnel is enormous, of the order of 50 MW per square meter of test section cross-sectional area. For this reason most wind tunnels operate intermittently using energy stored in high-pressure tanks. These wind tunnels are also called intermittent supersonic blowdown wind tunnels (of which a schematic preview is given below). Another way of achieving the huge power output is with the use of a vacuum storage tank.   These tunnels are called indraft supersonic wind tunnels, and are seldom used because they are restricted to low Reynolds numbers.  Some large countries have built major supersonic tunnels that run continuously; one is shown in the photo.  
Other problems operating a supersonic wind tunnel include:
starting and unstart of the test section (related to maintaining at least a minimum pressure ratio)
adequate supply of dry air
wall interference effects due to shock wave reflection and (sometimes) blockage
high-quality instruments capable of rapid measurements due to short run times in intermittent tunnels

Tunnels such as a Ludwieg tube have short test times (usually less than one second), relatively high Reynolds number, and low power requirements.

Further reading

See also
 Low speed wind tunnel
 High speed wind tunnel
 Hypersonic wind tunnel
 Ludwieg tube
 Shock tube

External links 
 Supersonic wind tunnel test demonstration (Mach 2.5) with flat plate and wedge creating an oblique shock(Video)

Fluid dynamics
Aerodynamics
Wind tunnels